Liotella vercoi is a species of minute sea snail, a marine gastropod mollusc in the family Skeneidae.

Description
The height of this poorly known shell attains 0.27 mm, its diameter 0.75 mm. The very minute, white, opaque shell consists of four whorls, including the smooth, globular protoconch. It has a discoidal shape with a sunken spire and is widely umbilicated. It is ornamented with transverse riblets. On the body whorl they number about 17. The intervening spaces are smooth, with the exception of a median spiral thread on the base. The aperture is circular.

Distribution
This marine species is endemic to Australia and was dredged at Wilson's Promontory off Victoria.

References

 Iredale, T. & McMichael, D.F. (1962). A reference list of the marine Mollusca of New South Wales. Memoirs of the Australian Museum. 11 : 1-109

External links
 Museum of Victoria: Liotella vercoi

vercoi
Gastropods of Australia
Gastropods described in 1914